

pre
Pre-Op
Pre-Pen
Pre-Sate

prec-pref
Precedex (Hospira, Inc). Redirects to dexmedetomidine.
Precef
preclamol (INN)
Precose (Bayer AG). Redirects to acarbose. 
Pred-G
Pred
Predair
Predamide
prednazate (INN)
prednazoline (INN)
prednicarbate (INN)
Prednicen-M
prednimustine (INN)
prednisolamate (INN)
prednisolone steaglate (INN)
prednisolone (INN)
prednisone (INN)
prednylidene (INN)
Predsulfair 
prefenamate (INN)
Prefest 
Prefrin-A

preg-pret
pregabalin (INN)
pregnenolone (INN)
Pregnyl 
preladenant (USAN)
Prelay 
Prelone 
Preludin 
premafloxacin (INN)
Premarin 
Premasol 
premazepam (INN)
Premphase 
Prempro 
prenalterol (INN)
prenisteine (INN)
prenoverine (INN)
prenoxdiazine (INN)
prenylamine (INN)
Preos
Preotact
Prepidil 
Presamine 
pretamazium iodide (INN)
pretiadil (INN)

prev-prez
Prevacare R 
Prevacid 
Prevalite 
Preven Emergency Contraceptive Kit 
Previfem 
Prevpac 
prezatide copper acetate (INN)
Prezista

pri

pria-prim
Prialt (Jazz Pharmaceuticals)
pribecaine (INN)
pridefine (INN)
prideperone (INN)
pridinol (INN)
pridopidine (INN)
prifelone (INN)
prifinium bromide (INN)
Priftin 
prifuroline (INN)
priliximab (INN)
prilocaine (INN)
Prilosec 
Primacor 
primaperone (INN)
primaquine (INN)
Primatene Mist 
Primaxin 
primidolol (INN)
primidone (INN)
Primsol 
primycin (INN)

prin-priz
prinaberel (USAN)
Principen 
Prinivil 
prinomide (INN)
prinoxodan (INN)
Prinzide 
Priscoline 
prisotinol (INN)
pristinamycin (INN)
Pristiq (Pfizer)
pritumumab (INN)
prizidilol (INN)